John Dalgleish Donaldson  (born 5 September 1941) is a Scottish-Australian professor and the father of Mary, Crown Princess of Denmark, the wife of the heir apparent to the throne of Denmark, Frederik, Crown Prince of Denmark.

Family and marriages
Donaldson was born at Cockenzie and Port Seton, Scotland, the son of Captain Peter Donaldson. Capt. Peter Donaldson sailed regularly on Port Seton Harbour and it is recorded that in 1962, he was on a voyage from Bass Strait Islands with a cargo of livestock, when the vessel Shearwater was lost off Ninth Island. He and his crew were saved and there are still remains of the ship on the island today.
 
On 31 August 1963, John Donaldson married his first wife, Henrietta Clark Horne (1942–1997), at Port Seton. They emigrated to Tasmania, Australia, in November of that year. Donaldson's parents and his older brother Peter and younger sister Roy also emigrated to Tasmania.  His father later worked as a captain for a large maritime trading company.  They had four children, Jane Alison Donaldson (born 26 December 1965), Patricia Anne Donaldson (born 16 March 1968), John Stuart Donaldson (born 9 July 1970) and Mary Elizabeth Donaldson (born 5 February 1972), married in 2004 to Frederik, Crown Prince of Denmark.

In addition to British citizenship, Donaldson obtained an Australian citizenship in 1975.

Henrietta died on 20 November 1997, and Donaldson later married Susan Elizabeth Horwood (born 1940) on 5 September 2001. She is a novelist and writes under the names Susan Moody, Susannah James and Susan Madison.

Education
In 1963, Donaldson obtained a BSc degree with honours in mathematics and physics from the University of Edinburgh. After receiving his bachelor's degree in Scotland, Donaldson moved to Australia to work under the direction of mathematician Professor David Elliott at the University of Tasmania, where he earned a PhD degree in mathematics in 1967.

Career
After receiving his doctorate in 1967, Donaldson remained at the University of Tasmania as a lecturer in applied mathematics and, on occasion, Dean of the Faculty of Science until his retirement in 2003. Subsequently, he has been professor of applied mathematics at the Korea Advanced Institute of Science and Technology (KAIST).  Donaldson was previously visiting professor of applied mathematics at several universities in Houston, Montreal, Oxford, from 2004 at Aarhus University and from 2006 also at the University of Copenhagen.

Honour and coat of arms
Doctorate, University of Tasmania, title conferred upon  Dr J. D. Donaldson, 1968
Grand Cross of the Order of the Dannebrog

With the marriage of his daughter Crown Princess Mary in 2004, Donaldson was honoured with the Order of the Dannebrog. In accordance with the statutes of the Danish Royal Orders, both he and his daughter were granted a coat of arms, this for display in the Chapel of the Royal Orders at Frederiksborg Castle. The main field of Donaldson's coat of arms is or tinctured and shows a gules MacDonald eagle and a Sable tinctured boat both symbolising his Scottish ancestry. The chief field is azure tinctured and shows two gold Commonwealth Stars from the Coat of arms of Australia, and a gold infinity symbol in between, symbolising his career as an Australian mathematician. Above the shield is placed a barred helmet topped with a gules rampant lion, which is turned outward. The lion is derived from the Scottish coat of arms and also from the arms of Tasmania and Hobart.

The coat of arms of The Crown Princess is almost identical to that of her father's, but a gold rose is depicted as her personal symbol, instead of the infinity symbol. The heraldic crown of a Crown Prince of Denmark is placed above her shield.

Publications

Notes and references
Genealogisches Handbuch des Adels, Fürstliche Häuser, Reference: 2004 11
The Ancestry of Mary Elizabeth Donaldson 2006, Reitwiesner, William Addams, Reference: nr.2

Other references

External links
 John D. Donaldson @ Mathematics Genealogy Project

1941 births
Living people
People from Cockenzie and Port Seton
Scottish emigrants to Australia
Naturalised citizens of Australia
Grand Crosses of the Order of the Dannebrog
Alumni of the University of Edinburgh
University of Tasmania alumni
Academic staff of the University of Tasmania
Academic staff of KAIST
Australian expatriates in South Korea
Australian mathematicians
Australian physicists